Okhissa Lake is a reservoir in the U.S. state of Mississippi.

Okhissa is a name derived from the Choctaw language meaning "porter". The name is a play on words, as the lake impounds Porter Creek.

References

Bodies of water of Franklin County, Mississippi
Reservoirs in Mississippi
Mississippi placenames of Native American origin